Laurence John Taylor (born 1 August 1936) is an English sociologist and radio presenter, originally from Liverpool.

Biography
After attending Roman Catholic schools including St Mary's College, Crosby, Merseyside, then a direct grant grammar and now an independent school, Taylor trained as an actor at Rose Bruford College, Sidcup, associated with Joan Littlewood's Theatre Workshop in Stratford, London. He was also a teacher at the Forest Hill comprehensive school for boys.

After earning degrees in sociology and psychology, as a mature student, at Birkbeck College and the University of Leicester, he joined the department of sociology at the University of York, eventually becoming a professor at that institution. He is retired from York.

Taylor is sometimes thought to be the model for Howard Kirk in Malcolm Bradbury's novel The History Man although Bradbury and Taylor had not met at the time the book was written. Taylor was then a member of the Trotskyist International Socialists.

Taylor is divorced from his third wife (whom he married in December 1988 in Camden), radio producer Cathie Mahoney who works on Loose Ends on BBC Radio 4. He was previously married to journalist Anna Coote, a former deputy editor of the New Statesman, who has also been associated with various public organisations. He is now married to Sally Feldman, journalist and former editor of Radio Four's Woman's Hour and currently a humanist celebrant.

Taylor's son, Matthew, is Chief Executive of the NHS Confederation.

Career
Taylor has a particular interest in criminology. He was one of the founder members of the National Deviancy Conference. A popular author writing on the media and fame, he has published widely in criminology. Perhaps his best-known early work was the book co-written with Stanley Cohen: Escape Attempts: The Theory and Practice of Resistance to Everyday Life. The book arose from research into the wellbeing of long-term prisoners. He has collaborated with bank robber turned author, John McVicar, on research.

Taylor has had an extensive broadcasting career on BBC Radio 4. For many years he was a participant on Robert Robinson's programme Stop The Week, later presented The Radio Programme and took on The Afternoon Shift, a re-branding of the ill-fated Anderson Country. His media associates have included Tom Baker and Victor Lewis-Smith.  In 1991 he appeared in the documentary Flesh and Blood: The Story of the Krays.

Since 1998, Taylor has regularly presented the discussion programme Thinking Allowed on BBC Radio 4, a series mainly devoted to the social sciences. In addition, he is known for his long-running  and mainly humorous column in the Times Higher Education Supplement as well as writing for the New Humanist and being a distinguished supporter of Humanists UK. He is the presenter of In Confidence, a series of one-hour in-depth interviews with public figures.

Honours
Honorary doctorate, Birmingham City University
Honorary doctorate, University of Nottingham, 1992
Honorary doctorate, University of Leicester, 2007
Honorary doctorate, Queen's University Belfast, 2008
Honorary doctorate, Aberdeen University, 2009
Honorary doctorate, Goldsmiths College, 2013
Honorary doctorate, Abertay University, 2016

Publications

Books
Taylor, L. 1967. Signs of Trouble: Aspects of Delinquency. BBC.
 
 

 Cohen, S. & Taylor, Laurie (1976), Escape attempts: the theory and practice of resistance in everyday life . New edition Routledge, 1992.
Taylor, L, R Lacey and D Bracken. 1980. In Whose Best Interests?: Unjust Treatment of Children in Courts and Institutions.  Civil Liberties Trust.
 
Taylor, L and B. Mullan. 1986.  Uninvited Guests: Intimate Secrets of Television and Radio. Chatto & Windus.
 

Taylor, L. 2004. The Laurie Taylor Guide to Higher Education. Butterworth-Heinemann.
Taylor, L. 2014. In Confidence: Talking Frankly about Fame. Zero Books.

Papers and contributions

References

External links

 Laurie Taylor biography at Radio 4's website
 BBC news item linking Taylor with Howard Kirk, The History Man
 Laurie Taylor's weekly "Poppletonian" column published in the Times Higher Education
 
 Thinking Allowed
 A short interview with LT at Really Magazine (2006)
 Laurie Taylor at the British Film Institute

1936 births
Living people
Academics from Liverpool
Academics of the University of York
Alumni of Birkbeck, University of London
Alumni of Rose Bruford College
Alumni of the University of Leicester
English radio personalities
British sociologists
English atheists
English humanists
English socialists
Former Roman Catholics
New Statesman people
People educated at St Mary's College, Crosby
People from Crosby, Merseyside
Radio presenters from Liverpool
English Trotskyists
Socialist Workers Party (UK) members